Micropera fasciculata, commonly known as the pale dismal orchid, is a species of epiphytic or lithophytic orchid with wiry stems forming large, tangled clumps. It has stiff, leathery leaves and flowering stems with between ten and twenty cream-coloured flowers with a white labellum. This orchid occurs in New Guinea, Queensland, the Solomon Islands and New Caledonia.

Description
The petals are similar is size to the lateral sepals. The side lobes are triangular and erect and the middle lobe curves downwards with a deep, sac-like spur. Flowering occurs from March to June.

Taxonomy and naming
The pale dismal orchid was first formally described in 1843 by John Lindley who gave it the name Saccolobium fasciculatum and published the description in London Journal of Botany. In 1972 Leslie Andrew Garay changed the name to Micropera fasciculata.

Distribution and habitat
Micropera fasciculata forms large clumps on trees and rocks in lowland rainforest in New Guinea, the Solomon Islands, New Caledonia and the Cape York Peninsula in Queensland as far south as Townsville.

References

fasciculata
Orchids of Australia
Orchids of New Guinea
Orchids of the Philippines
Orchids of Taiwan
Orchids of Indonesia
Plants described in 1843